Luis de Riaño (1596–c. 1667) was a Peruvian criollo painter, active in the 17th-century. His work is an important representation of Cusco School, the Peruvian colonial painting style.

Biography 
Luis de Riaño was born in 1596 in Lima, Viceroyalty of Peru. He was the son of Ana de Cáceres, and Spanish captain Juan de Riaño.  

He studied Counter-Maniera style painting under Angelino Medoro from 1611 to 1618. Another student of Medoro who started a few years earlier in 1604 was Pedro de Loayza, an Indigenous Andean painter. Medoro's painting "Inmaculada Concepción" (1618) in Lima was copied by de Riaño at the Recoleta Monastery in Cusco.

De Riaño is best known for his frescos painted in the 1620s at the Church of San Pedro de Andahuaylillas in the Andahuaylillas District in Cusco, nicknamed the "Sistine Chapel of the Americas". The painting depicts the roads to heaven and to hell.

He remained an active painter until the 1640s. He is thought to have had financial problems later in life. He died after 1667.

Works 

 Inmaculada Concepción, Recoleta Monastery, Cusco
 Various frescos, paintings, and murals, Church of San Pedro de Andahuaylillas, Cusco
 Bautismo de Cristo, Church of San Pedro de Andahuaylillas, Cusco
 San Miguel arcángel, Church of San Pedro de Andahuaylillas, Cusco
 Four canvases related to the life of Saint Peter, Church of San Pedro de Andahuaylillas, Cusco
 Two canvases related to the life of Saint Paul, Church of San Pedro de Andahuaylillas, Cusco
 Inmaculada (1638), Cusco
 Santa Catalina de Alejandría, private collection, Cusco
 Anunciación de la Virgen por Arcángel Miguel (1632), Museo Pedro de Osma, Lima
 Los desposorios de la Virgen
 Bautismo de Cristo

References 

1596 births
Peruvian painters
17th-century Peruvian people
People from Lima
Cusco School